Hieracium argutum is a species of flowering plant in the family Asteraceae known by the common name southern hawkweed.

It is endemic to California, where it can be found in coastal and inland hills and mountains, often in oak woodland and pine forest habitat.

Description
Hieracium argutum is a perennial herb producing a mostly erect stem which is very hairy on the lower part and becomes nearly hairless toward the tip. The plant grows 60 centimeters to one meter tall.

The deeply toothed leaves are covered in long hairs. The largest leaves at the base of the stem may reach 16 centimeters. There may be shorter leaves on the lower part of the stem and there are few or none on the upper part.

The inflorescence is a wide open array of many flower heads, each up to about a centimeter wide. The flower head is lined with hairy, often glandular phyllaries and filled with many yellow ray florets and no disc florets.

The fruit is a small, dark cylindrical achene topped with a pappus of brown bristles.

References

External links
Jepson Manual Treatment
Flora of North America

argutum
Endemic flora of California
Flora of the Sierra Nevada (United States)
Natural history of the California chaparral and woodlands
Natural history of the California Coast Ranges
Natural history of the Channel Islands of California
Natural history of the Santa Monica Mountains
Natural history of the Transverse Ranges